The 2016 Women's South American Volleyball Club Championship was the eighth official edition of the women's volleyball tournament, played by six teams from 24 – 28 February 2016 in La Plata, Argentina. The Brazilian club Rexona Ades claimed their third title defeating the Universidad San Martín, from Peru, by 3–0 in the final match.

Competing clubs
Teams were seeded in two pools of three according to how the representatives of their countries finished in the 2015 edition.

Preliminary round

First round

Pool A

|}

|}

Pool B

|}

|}

Final round

Bracket

Fifth place match

|}

Semifinals

|}

Third place match

|}

Final

|}

Final standing

All-Star team

Most Valuable Player
 Ana Carolina da Silva (Rexona Ades)
Best Opposite
 Micaela Fabiani (Villa Dora)
Best Outside Hitters
 Ángela Leyva (Universidad San Martín)
 Gabriela Guimarães (Rexona Ades)

Best Setter
 Zoila La Rosa (Universidad San Martín)
Best Middle Blockers
 Ana Carolina da Silva (Rexona Ades)
 Candelaria Herrera (Villa Dora)
Best Libero
 Fabiana de Oliveira (Rexona Ades)

References

South American Volleyball Club Championship
2016 in Argentine sport
2016
International volleyball competitions hosted by Argentina